NGC 940 is a lenticular galaxy in the constellation Triangulum. It is estimated to be 222 million light-years from the Milky Way and has a diameter of approximately 80,000 ly. NGC 940 was discovered by Heinrich d'Arrest.

See also 
 List of NGC objects (1–1000)

References

External links
 

0940
Triangulum (constellation)
Lenticular galaxies
009478